Frank Duncan Costenbader (1905 - March 19, 1978) was an American physician frequently credited as the world's first pediatric ophthalmologist. He died on March 16, 1978, at his home in Washington following a stroke.

References

1905 births
1978 deaths
American ophthalmologists
Pediatric ophthalmologists
American pediatricians
20th-century American physicians